Nginiiig is a Philippine reality drama-horror-action-thriller-paranormal-supsence television program aired by ABS-CBN. It aired from March 6, 2004 to April 8, 2006. It was hosted by Raymond Bagatsing, then by Jericho Rosales, and finally Hero Angeles, with Rayver Cruz, Maja Salvador and John Wayne Sace serving as substitute hosts or guest co-hosts.

Format
The show is presented as a docu-drama wherein it features real reality horror-action-thriller and paranormal stories through re-enactments based on the victims' account of the horrifying events. The victims are interviewed about the events that took place in the haunted venues and actors and actresses play them in the reconstructions. Similarly to the Undas episodes of the ABS-CBN telemagazine news program Magandang Gabi, Bayan, the haunted venues serve as studio settings for the show.

Cancellation
Director Luis Santiago, died on June 8, 2005. Santiago, who had just completed a feature film version of the show, was passing by a bar in Makati when an intoxicated patron suddenly brandished a firearm and opened fire indiscriminately. A stray bullet from the shooting hit the director, fatally injuring him. Despite that, the series continued with an unnamed new director until its end on April 8, 2006.

Spin-offs
Nginiiig: The Hidden Files and Nginiiig: Paranormal Investigation aired on the now defunct Studio 23, the latter was hosted by members of the Streetboys.

Reruns
Reruns of the show's episodes airs on Jeepney TV. Select portions of some of its episodes were aired on Cine Mo! as part of its commercial breaks.

This series is currently aired on Kapamilya Online Live Global every Sunday morning.

Promotion
The show was one of the shows chosen to be part of the Kasakay Mo, Kapamilya Mo MRT ad campaign launched by ABS-CBN in 2005.

Historical connections 
Many paranormal stories presented in the series have connections to real-life historic events. These include World War II, Japanese occupation of the Philippines, Marcos Martial law, Leyte landslide, Ozone disco club fire, 1990 Luzon earthquake, 1991 Pinatubo eruption, and many others.

Episodes

Nginiig with Raymond Bagatsing

Nginiig with Jericho Rosales

Nginiig with Hero Angeles 
The Hero Angeles era was the last to feature Luigi Santiago as director. After Santiago's death in 2005, the series continued under a different director, with Angeles continuing to host.

See also
 List of programs broadcast by ABS-CBN
 List of programs broadcast by Jeepney TV

References

External links
 

ABS-CBN original programming
2004 Philippine television series debuts
2006 Philippine television series endings
Philippine horror fiction television series
Philippine anthology television series
Filipino-language television shows